Frederick Somerset Gough Calthorpe (27 May 1892 – 19 November 1935), styled The Honourable from 1912, was an English first-class cricketer.

Born in London, Calthorpe ("pronounced with the first syllable rhyming with 'tall' and not with 'shall'") was a member of the Gough-Calthorpe family, the son of Somerset Frederick Gough-Calthorpe, who inherited the title of 8th Baron Calthorpe in 1912. Freddie Calthorpe was educated at Windlesham House School, Repton and Jesus College, Cambridge. He served in the Royal Air Force during World War I.

In a first-class career that extended from 1911 to 1935, Calthorpe played cricket for Sussex, Cambridge University, Warwickshire and England. He toured with Marylebone Cricket Club (MCC) to Australia and New Zealand in 1922–23, a trip that also served as a honeymoon for him and his bride Dorothy. He captained Warwickshire from 1920 to 1929, and also led a strong MCC team on a tour of the West Indies in 1925–26.

He captained England in his only four Test matches: on the first ever Test tour of the West Indies in 1929–30, which was drawn 1–1. This tour was played simultaneously to another England Test tour to New Zealand, where England were captained by Harold Gilligan. During the tour, in a speech he gave in Barbados, he condemned the bowling tactic, later known as bodyline, which had been used by the West Indian fast bowler Learie Constantine.

He died of cancer in Worplesdon, Surrey.

Calthorpe is distantly related to the cricket commentator Henry Blofeld, and more closely to the England captain H. D. G. Leveson Gower and the early cricket patron John Sackville, 3rd Duke of Dorset.

References

External links

Brief footage of Calthorpe from British Pathe (at 4.12, 5.51 and 6.53)

1892 births
1935 deaths
Military personnel from London
Royal Air Force airmen
People educated at Repton School
Alumni of Jesus College, Cambridge
Cambridge University cricketers
Royal Air Force personnel of World War I
England Test cricketers
England Test cricket captains
English cricketers
Sussex cricketers
Warwickshire cricketers
Warwickshire cricket captains
Free Foresters cricketers
Marylebone Cricket Club cricketers
Gentlemen cricketers
North v South cricketers
Gough-Calthorpe family
English cricketers of 1919 to 1945
H. D. G. Leveson Gower's XI cricketers
People educated at Windlesham House School
L. H. Tennyson's XI cricket team